Tantric or variations may refer to:

Religion

Beliefs and practices
Tantra, esoteric traditions of Hinduism and Buddhism
Tantric sex, tantric practices to exercise sexuality in a ritualized or yogic context
Tantric yoga, a form of yoga
Vajrayana, also known as Tantric Buddhism
Tibetan tantric practice
Neotantra, a Western form of tantra
Tantra massage, a form of erotic massage

Religious texts
Tantras (Buddhism), Indian and Tibetan texts which outline Buddhist religious systems
Tantras (Hinduism), scriptures pertaining to esoteric traditions rooted in Hindu philosophy

Music
Tantric (band), a hard rock band from Louisville, Kentucky
Tantric (album), the debut album by the band of the same name

Other uses
Tantra (Kolkata), a nightclub in Kolkata, India
Tantras (novel), a Forgotten Realms novel 
Tantras (module), a Forgotten Realms adventure